Mohammad Saiful Alam is a lieutenant general in the Bangladesh Army and Quarter Master General (QMG) of Bangladesh Army in Army Headquarters.  He is the former director general of Directorate General of Forces Intelligence (DGFI). He also served as GOC in 11 Infantry Division & Area Commander.

Early life 
Saiful Alam passed SSC and HSC from Jhenaidah Cadet College in 1982 and 1984 respectively.

Career 
Alam was commissioned on 27 June 1986 in the 14th Bangladesh Military Academy Long Course. He won the Sword of Honour and Academic Gold Medal in his BMA long course. He has Commanded an Infantry Brigade under 11th Infantry Division. After serving as the General Officer Commanding of 11th Infantry Division & Area Commander, Bogura Area in Bogra Cantonment, he was appointed Director General of Directorate General of Forces Intelligence on 28 February 2020. Prior to his duties in Bogra, he was the General Officer Commanding GOC of 7th Infantry Division & Area Commander of Barishal Area, Barisal Sheikh Hasina cantonment.

On 5 July 2021, Alam was appointed the Quarter Master General of Bangladesh Army in Army Headquarters .

References 

Bangladeshi generals
Directors General of the Directorate General of Forces Intelligence
Year of birth missing (living people)
Living people